Frank O'Rourke may refer to:
Frank O'Rourke (writer) (1916–1989), American writer
Frank O'Rourke (Australian rules footballer) (1906–1978), Australian rules footballer
Frank O'Rourke (baseball) (1893–1986), Canadian baseball player
Frank O'Rourke (politician) (born 1967), Irish Fianna Fáil politician, TD for Kildare North 2016–2020
Frank O'Rourke (rugby league) (1906–1994), Australian rugby league footballer of the 1920s and 1930s
Frank O'Rourke (Scottish footballer) (1878–1954), Scottish footballer for Airdrieonians and Bradford City
Frank O'Rourke (wrestler), American professional wrestler